DeSoto County is the name of two counties and one parish in the United States of America:

DeSoto County, Florida
DeSoto Parish, Louisiana
DeSoto County, Mississippi

See also
De Soto (disambiguation)
DeSoto Parish, Louisiana
USS De Soto County (LST-1171), a post-war Landing Ship Tank of the US Navy